The Albania national badminton team represents Albania in international badminton team competitions. The Albania national team is controlled by the Albania Badminton Federation and is under the Badminton Europe confederation. Being part of the Balkan region, the Albania team competes in the Balkan Badminton Championships.

Junior competitive record

Balkan Badminton Championships 
The Balkan Badminton Championships is a series of tournaments organized by the Balkan Badminton Association and involves participants from countries in the Balkans. The junior team championships are divided into four different age groups, which are U19, U17, U15 and U13.

Mixed team

U19

U15

Staff 
The following list shows the coaching staff for the Albanian national badminton team.

Players

Current squad

Men's team

Women's team

References 

Badminton
National badminton teams